Fajar Legian Siswanto (born August 27, 1987) is an Indonesian footballer who currently plays for Persisam Putra Samarinda in the Indonesia Super League. He was born in Indonesia to a German father and Balinese mother.

Club statistics

References

External links

1987 births
Living people
Indo people
Indonesian people of German descent
Association football midfielders
Indonesian footballers
Liga 1 (Indonesia) players
Persisam Putra Samarinda players
Semen Padang F.C. players
Indonesian Premier Division players
Persih Tembilahan players
Sportspeople from Jakarta
Balinese people